Zabita Khan Rohilla (died 21 January 1785) was a Rohilla chieftain in the time of the Mughal Emperor Shah Alam II.

Biography 
Zabita Khan was the eldest son of Najib-ud-Daula, a leader of the Afghan Rohilla and founder of the city of Najibabad (Uttar Pradesh). The Rohillas were Afghans who settled between Delhi and the Himalaya with Bareilly as their first city. They were let by individual chieftains. In the mid-18th century, their most important chieftains were Najib-ud-Daula, Hafiz Rahmat Khan and Ahmed Khan Bangash.

Zabita Khan is known to have fought alongside his father during the Third Battle of Panipat in 1761.

In March 1768 Najib-ud-Daula retired his leadership over the Rohillas and declared Zabita Khan to be his successor, while he moved to Najibabad. Two of Najib-ud-Daula's high-ranking officers resisted (Ali Muhammed Kur and Sayyid Mian Asrar-ud-din [also known as Lambi Mian]) but were crushed by Zabita Khan. On 15 October 1769 Najib-ud-Daula went to Delhi, where Zabita Khan was hosted by the Dowager Empress and the Crown Prince.

At the time of his father's death on 31October 1770, Zabita Khan was said to be the second richest person in northern India after the Jat King. As his father's eldest son he was invested as Mir Bakhshi (Head of the Mughal Army) by Shah Alam II on 29December 1770. During his rule, the Marathas captured, first Delhi in 1771 and then Rohilkhand in 1772, forcing him to flee to the camp of the Nawab of Awadh, Shuja-ud-Daula. He also failed to prevent the Sikh Khalsa occupation of Delhi during the Battle of Delhi (1783).

Death 

Zabita Khan died on 21 January 1785. He was succeeded by his son Ghulam Kadir. His grave is in the courtyard of the Dargah Qutub Sahib in Mehrauli, a shrine dedicated to the Sufi mystic Qutbuddin Bakhtiar Kaki, and preserved to this day. Some allege that he is buried next to his son Ghulam Kadir, though most consider it more likely that the adjacent grave belongs to Zabita Khan's wife.

Legacy 
Zabita Khan founded the Masjid Zabta Ganj, a mosque in Delhi, which is still operated.

See also
 Shah Alam II
 Ghulam Kadir
 Mirza Najaf Khan

References

Bibliography

Further reading
 Fall of the Moghul Empire of Hindustan, Keene, H. G.

Mughal Empire people
Nawabs of India
History of Uttar Pradesh
Rohilla
18th-century Indian Muslims
Indian people of Pashtun descent
1785 deaths